The Member of Parliament for Leeds Central, Rt. Hon. Derek Fatchett, (Labour) died suddenly on 9 May 1999. The Labour government rushed to organise for the by-election and moved the writ so that the election could be held on 10 June, the same day as elections to the European Parliament.

The shortlist for the Labour candidacy included the Chair of Leeds Central Constituency Labour Party, Maggie Giles-Hill, and Shahid Malik, but the selection went to Hilary Benn who had been Special Adviser to David Blunkett, then Secretary of State for Education and Employment. The Conservatives chose their general election candidate Edward Wild. The Liberal Democrats provided the strongest challenge and increased their vote by nearly 20%, but this was not enough to take the seat.

The campaign was subsumed with the European Parliament elections, and the result was an all-time low turnout for a by-election: at 19.9% it held the record for the lowest turnout in a UK parliamentary election since World War II, until surpassed in 2012 by the Manchester Central by-election.

Results

General Election result, 1997

References 

Central, 1999
Leeds Central by-election
Leeds Central by-election
Leeds Central by-election
1990s in Leeds